Gemeente vervoerbedrijf Utrecht (GVU) (English:Utrecht municipal transport) was the operator of city buses in Utrecht, Netherlands until December 2013. It is replaced by Qbuzz.

History
Connexxion took GVU over on 1 January 2007. Since December 2013 Qbuzz took over the operation of city services in Utrecht. In 2000 GVU carried 30 million passengers and this figure continues to rise with 39 million passengers in 2006. GVU used 25m long Van Hool AGG300 buses on routes 11, 12, 12s and occasionally 31. For these routes changed to the road layouts were made.

Fleet
GVU used mostly Van Hool buses, along with a number of former Connexxion.

References

External links
www.gvu.nl

Bus companies of the Netherlands